The Big Sandy Area Development District (BSADD) is a regional planning and development organization that focuses on economic and community development; community services; aging and disability services; and housing services for a five county region in Eastern Kentucky. The five counties served within the region includes Floyd, Johnson, Magoffin, Martin, and Pike counties. The Big Sandy Area Development District office is located at 110 Resource Court in Prestonsburg, Kentucky.

History

The concept of area development districts within the state of Kentucky was first visualized by Governor Bert T. Combs in 1961. By 1967, the state of Kentucky was divided into fifteen districts. BSADD received designation and funding from the Appalachian Regional Commission and the U.S. Department of Commerce, Economic Development Administration in 1968. On February 10, 1972, the Big Sandy Area Regional Development District, along with the other fourteen development districts, were established by the Kentucky General Assembly.

Demographics

As of the census of 2000, there were 160,532 people, 63,396 households, and 46,976 families residing in the district. The population density was 80.8 people per square mile (31.2/km2). The racial makeup of the district was 97.38% White, 0.59% African American, 0.12% Native American, 0.29% Asian, 0.04% Pacific Islander, 0.09% from other races, and 0.59% from two or more races. Hispanics or Latinos of any race were 1.23% of the population.

There were 63,396 households, out of which 36.98% had children under the age of 18 living with them, 58.71% were married couples living together, 11.71% had a female householder with no husband present, 2.13% were non-families and 23.77% were made up of individuals. The average household size was 2.49 and the average family size was 2.94.

The age distribution was 24.3% under 18, 9.4% from 18 to 24, 29.9% from 25 to 44, 24.6% from 45 to 64, and 12% who were 65 or older. The median age was 36.6 years. For every 100 females there were 81.9 males.

See also

Southwest Tennessee Development District

References

External links
Big Sandy Area Development District
Big Sandy Regional Industrial Development Authority
Kentucky Council of Area Development Districts

Organizations based in Kentucky
Floyd County, Kentucky
Johnson County, Kentucky
Martin County, Kentucky
Magoffin County, Kentucky
Pike County, Kentucky
Prestonsburg, Kentucky
Society of Appalachia